Pelly is the surname of:

Blake Pelly (1907–1990), Australian air force officer, politician and businessman
Sir Claude Pelly (1902–1972), British air chief marshal
Fred Pelly (1868–1940), English footballer
Henry Joseph Pelly (1818–1891), British Army officer and a general in the Indian Army's Bombay Staff Corps
John Pelly, (1777–1852), English businessman and Hudson's Bay Company governor, first Baronet Pelly
Laurent Pelly (born 1962), French opera and theatre director
Lewis Pelly (1825–1892), British politician and East India Company lieutenant general
Pat Pelly (1877–1939), Australian rules footballer
Thomas Pelly (1902–1973), American politician
Tom Pelly (1936–2006), Australian rules footballer
various Pelly baronets

See also
Pelley, surname
Pelli, surname